Pierre Crousillac (14 November 1921 – 17 December 2011) was a French General and a member of the French Resistance during World War II.

Youth

He was born in Brive-la-Gaillarde in Corrèze, France.
He grew up in Tulle and began his Classes préparatoires aux grandes ecoles at the Lycée Louis-le-Grand before joining the École Polytechnique in September 1942.
After two months, he was sent to the Chantiers de la jeunesse to work as a team leader in Argelès-sur-Mer, Saint-Amans-Soult and then Argentat.
In October 1943, he refused to go to Germany for the Service du travail obligatoire and joined the Resistance, becoming part of the secret army of Brive-la-Gaillarde and led a military company.
When peace returned he came back to the École Polytechnique to study until 1948 and then went to the Ecole des transmissions.

First Indochina War

His first affectation was to help to route the convoys of the Marshall Plan to Europe.
In 1951, he embarked on la Marseillaise to Saïgon.
Commanding officer of the compagnie opérationnelle des transmissions, he led the transmission department of the great operations in North Tonkin, in particular in Nassan.
He received three honours for his organizational skills and the influence he had on his soldiers.

Honours

Croix du combattant volontaire de la Résistance
Croix de la Valeur Militaire
Croix de guerre des Théâtres d'opérations extérieurs
Commandeur de l’ordre national du mérite
Commandeur de l’Ordre national de la Légion d'honneur

1921 births
2011 deaths
People from Brive-la-Gaillarde
École Polytechnique alumni
French generals
French Resistance members
Commanders of the Ordre national du Mérite
Commandeurs of the Légion d'honneur
Recipients of the Cross for Military Valour